Richland County Transit is the provider of mass transportation in Mansfield, Ohio. Nine routes operate Monday through Friday. Over 500 signed stops are located within the system.

References

External links
 RCT

Bus transportation in Ohio
Transportation in Richland County, Ohio
Mansfield, Ohio